Giovanni da Verrazzano (often misspelled Verrazano in English; 1485–1528) was an Italian (Florentine) explorer of North America, in the service of King Francis I of France.

He is renowned as the first European to explore the Atlantic coast of North America between Florida and New Brunswick in 1524, including New York Bay and Narragansett Bay.

Early life
Verrazzano was born in Val di Greve, south of Florence, the capital and the main city of the Republic of Florence, the son of Piero Andrea di Bernardo da Verrazzano and Fiammetta Cappelli. It is generally claimed that he was born in the Castello di Verrazzano, hence its birth indicator (similar to Leonardo da Vinci). 

Some alternative theories have been elaborated; for example, certain French scholarship assumes that Verrazzano was born in Lyon, France, the son of Alessandro di Bartolommeo da Verrazano and Giovanna Guadagni. 

"Whatever the case," writes Ronald S. Love, "Verrazzano always considered himself to be Florentine," and he was considered a Florentine by his contemporaries as well. 

He signed documents employing a Latin version of his name, "Janus Verrazanus", and he called himself "Jehan de Verrazane" in his will dated 11 May 1526 in Rouen, France (preserved at the Archives départementales de la Seine-Maritime).

In contrast to his detailed account of his voyages to North America, little is known about his personal life. After 1506, he settled in the port of Dieppe, Kingdom of France, where he began his career as a navigator.

He embarked for the American coast probably in 1508 in the company of captain Thomas Aubert, on the ship La Pensée, equipped by the owner, Jean Ango. He explored the region of Newfoundland, possibly during a fishing trip, and possibly the St. Lawrence River in Canada; on other occasions, he made numerous voyages to the eastern Mediterranean.

1522–24 voyage to America 
In September 1522, the surviving members of Ferdinand Magellan's crew returned to Spain, having circumnavigated the globe.  Competition in trade was becoming urgent, especially with Portugal. 

King Francis I of France was impelled by French merchants and financiers from Lyon and Rouen who were seeking new trade routes and so he asked Verrazzano in 1523 to make plans to explore on France's behalf an area between Florida and Terranova, the "New Found Land", with the goal of finding a sea route to the Pacific Ocean. 

Within months, four ships set sail due west for the Grand Banks of Newfoundland, but a violent storm and rough seas caused the loss of two ships. The remaining two damaged ships, La Dauphine and La Normande, were forced to return to Brittany.

Repairs were completed in the final weeks of 1523, and the ships set sail again. This time the ships headed south toward calmer waters, which were under hostile Spanish and Portuguese control. 

After a stop in Madeira, complications forced La Normande back to home port, but Verrazzano's ship La Dauphine departed on January 17, 1524, piloted by Antoine de Conflans, and headed once more for the North American continent. 

It neared the area of Cape Fear on about March 21st and, after a short stay, reached the Pamlico Sound lagoon of modern North Carolina. In a letter to Francis I described by historians as the Cèllere Codex, Verrazzano wrote that he was convinced that the Sound was the beginning of the Pacific Ocean from which access could be gained to China.

Continuing to explore the coast further northwards, Verrazzano and his crew came into contact with Native Americans living on the coast. However, he did not notice the entrances to Chesapeake Bay or the mouth of the Delaware River.

In New York Bay, he encountered the Lenape in about 30 Lenape canoes and observed what he deemed to be a large lake, really  the entrance to the Hudson River. He then sailed along Long Island and entered Narragansett Bay, where he received a delegation of Wampanoag and Narragansett people. 

The words "Norman villa" are found on the 1527 map by Visconte Maggiolo identifying the site.  The historian Samuel Eliot Morison writes that "this occurs at Angouleme (New York) rather than Refugio (Newport). It was probably intended to compliment one of Verrazzano's noble friends.  There are several places called 'Normanville' in Normandy, France. The main one is located near Fécamp and another important one near Évreux, which would naturally be it. West of it, conjecturally on the Delaware or New Jersey coast, is a Longa Villa, which Verrazzano certainly named after François d'Orléans, duc de Longueville."  He stayed there for two weeks and then moved northwards.

He discovered Cape Cod Bay, his claim being proved by a map of 1529 that clearly outlined Cape Cod. He named the cape after a general, calling it Pallavicino. He then followed the coast up to modern Maine, southeastern Nova Scotia, and Newfoundland, and he then returned to France by 8 July 1524. Verrazzano named the region that he explored Francesca in honor of the French king, but his brother's map labeled it Nova Gallia (New France).

Later life and death
Verrazzano arranged a second voyage, with financial support from Jean Ango and Philippe de Chabot, which departed from Dieppe with four ships early in 1527. One ship was separated from the others in a gale near the Cape Verde Islands, but Verrazzano reached the coast of Brazil with two ships and harvested a cargo of brazilwood before returning to Dieppe in September. The third ship returned later, also with a cargo of brazilwood.

The partial success did not find the desired passage to the Pacific Ocean, but it inspired Verrazzano's final voyage, which left Dieppe in early 1528.

There are conflicting accounts of Verrazzano's demise. In one version, during his third voyage to North America in 1528, after he had explored Florida, the Bahamas, and the Lesser Antilles, Verrazzano anchored out to sea and rowed ashore, probably on the island of Guadeloupe. He was allegedly killed and eaten by the native Caribs. The fleet of two or three ships was anchored out of gunshot range, and no one could respond in time.  However, older historical accounts suggest that Verrazzano was the same person as the corsair Jean Fleury, who was executed for piracy by the Spanish at Puerto del Pico, Spain.

Legacy

The geographic information derived from this voyage had a significant influence on sixteenth-century cartographers. Despite his discoveries, Verrazzano's reputation did not proliferate as much as other explorers of that era. For example, Verrazzano gave the European name Francesca to the new land that he had seen, in accordance with contemporary practices, after the French king in whose name he sailed. That and other names that he bestowed on features that he discovered have not survived. He had the misfortune of making major discoveries in the same three years (1519 to 1521) that the dramatic Conquest of the Aztec Empire and Ferdinand Magellan's circumnavigation of the world occurred. Magellan himself did not complete his voyage, but his publicist Antonio Pigafetta did so, and Spanish publicity outweighed the news of the French voyage.

In the 19th and the early 20th centuries, there was a great debate in the United States about the authenticity of the letters that he wrote to Francis I to describe the geography, flora, fauna, and native population of the east coast of North America. Others thought that they were authentic, almost universally the current opinion, particularly after the discovery of a letter signed by Francis I, which referred to Verrazzano's letter.

Verrazzano's reputation was particularly obscure in New York City, where the 1609 voyage of Henry Hudson on behalf of the Dutch Republic came to be regarded as the de facto start of European exploration of New York. It was only by a great effort in the 1950s and 1960s that Verrazzano's name and reputation were re-established as the European discoverer of the harbor, during an effort to name the newly built Narrows bridge after him.

Commemorations

In 1909, during the Hudson-Fulton Celebration, a bronze statue of Verrazzano by Ettore Ximenes was installed in Battery Park in Manhattan.
There are numerous commemorations of the explorer on Staten Island.
The Verrazzano-Narrows Bridge, spanning The Narrows that separate Staten Island from Brooklyn, is perhaps the best known. Until October 2018, it was known as the "Verrazano-Narrows Bridge" with one "z".
A Staten Island Ferry boat that served New York from the 1950s to the 1990s was also named for Verrazzano. The ferry was named the "Verrazzano", while the bridge was named "Verrazano", reflecting the confusion over the spelling of his name.
A Little League team on Staten Island is also named for him.
The Jamestown Verrazzano Bridge in Narragansett Bay, Rhode Island, is named for him, as is Maryland's Verrazano Bridge.
She was launched in 1930 and sunk by a British submarine in 1942.
There is a statue of him in the town of Greve in Chianti, Italy.
There is a monument commemorating him in Rehoboth Beach, Delaware; it states on its south face:

The monument further states on its east face:

A native of Val Di Greve in the Tuscany region of Italy, he studied navigation as a young man and became a master mariner. He was engaged by the King of France to lead a voyage to North America in 1524. The purpose of Verrazzano's journey was to learn more about the continent. Traveling in a small ship known as the Dauphine, he explored coastal areas from the present-day State of North Carolina to Canada, observing the natural abundance of the land and the vibrant culture of its native peoples. His voyage is the earliest documented European exploration of this part of the Atlantic Coast.This monument rests upon stone from Castello di Verrazzano, the explorer's ancestral home.

References

Further reading

Masini, Giancarlo; Gori, Iacopo (1999). How Florence Invented America, New York, Marsilio Publishers.
Castelnovi Michele (2005), Luoghi e tempi di un errore cartografico: l’istmo di Verrazzano (1524-1593), in Luoghi e tempo nella cartografia, Atti del Convegno nazionale dell’Associazione Italiana di Cartografia Trieste aprile 2005, a cura di C. Donato, in “Bollettino dell’Associazione Italiana di Cartografia”, nn. 123-124, Trieste, 2005, pp. 295-306.

External links
 Verrazzano Centre for Historical Studies

1485 births
1528 deaths
People from Greve in Chianti
Italian explorers of North America
16th-century people of the Republic of Florence
Italian explorers
Explorers of Canada
Cannibalised people
Explorers of Florida